"Pray" is a song by English singer and songwriter Sam Smith. It was written by Smith, Larrance Dopson, Darryl Pearson,
Timbaland, Jose Valasquez and Jimmy Napes, with production handled by Timbaland, Napes and Steve Fitzmaurice. The song was released on 6 October 2017 through Capitol Records, as a promotional single from Smith's second studio album, The Thrill of It All (2017). A new version of the song featuring American rapper Logic was released as the third single from the album on 29 March 2018.

Background
On 4 October 2017, Smith teased the song on social media by posting a video, alongside the song's release date. They tweeted shortly after the song's release: "I hope you love 'Pray', I hope it becomes your friend in those deep dark nights of confusion and loneliness. Love you all so much." They explained to Billboard that "Pray" was prompted by time spent in Iraq with the charity War Child, saying: "I spent five days in Mosul and came back embarrassed that I had known so little about the world and other people's lives. I went back to that great Nina Simone quote, that it is important to speak about the times you live in. I hadn't done that; I'd just written a bunch of songs about love. So I wanted to write about how I'm now starting to open my eyes, at 25, to what is going on in the rest of the world, and that it's not always pretty."

Critical reception
Daniel Kreps of Rolling Stone called "Pray" a "gospel-inspired track" that is "bolstered by a textbook but understated Timbaland beat". Winston Cook-Wilson of Spin deemed it a "half spare R&B, half gospel shuffle downbeat track". Nick Reilly of NME wrote: "The soul-infused track features Timbaland on production duties, and comes complete with powerful choral backing." Alex Ross of Vice regarded it as "a soulful downtempo ballad that showcases Smith's vocal versatility and conjures a little more drama", writing that it is more interesting when compared with "Too Good at Goodbyes". Lauren O'Neill of the same publication wrote that the song "pretty much follows the structure" of "Too Good at Goodbyes", making Smith's voice "predictable", which he called "a shame when there's so much to work with". Mike Wass of Idolator wrote that the song "introduces aspects of hip-hop into [Smith's] sound and finds [them] singing about world issues".

Live performances
On 7 October 2017, Smith performed "Pray" and "Too Good at Goodbyes" on Saturday Night Live.

Formats and track listings

Credits and personnel
Credits adapted from Tidal.

 Sam Smith – songwriting, vocals
 Larrance Dopson – songwriting
 Darryl Pearson – songwriting, guitar
 Timbaland – songwriting, production, drum programming, drums, percussion, programming
 Jose Valasquez – songwriting
 Jimmy Napes – songwriting, production
 Steve Fitzmaurice – production, engineering, mixing
 Bob Ludwig – mastering engineering
 Gus Pirelli – engineering
 Darren Heelis – engineering, drum programming
 Jodi Milliner – bass guitar
 LaDonna Harley-Peters – background vocals
 Vula Malinga – background vocals
 The LJ Singers – background vocals
 Vicky Akintola – background vocals
 Patrick Linton – background vocals
 Isabel Grundy Gracefield – assistant recording engineering
 Steph Marziano – assistant recording engineering
 John Prestage – assistant recording engineering
 Will Purton – assistant recording engineering
 Darren Heelis – engineering, drum programming
 Earl Harvin – drums, percussion
 Ben Jones – guitar
 Reuben James – organ
 Lawrence Dopson – piano
 Simon Hale – string arranging
 Richard George – strings
 Bruce White – strings
 Everton Nelson – strings
 Ian Burdge – strings
 Lawrence Johnson – vocal arranging

Charts

Certifications

Release history

Note

Logic version

On 29 March 2018, a remix of the song featuring American rapper Logic. it was re-released to digital download and streaming on 27 April 2018. It was also sent to contemporary hit radio formats in Australia, Italy and the United Kingdom as the third single from Smith's second studio album The Thrill of It All.

Music videos
The music video for "Pray" featuring Logic was released on 9 May 2018, directed by Joe Connor.

Track listings

Charts

Release history

References

External links

2010s ballads
2017 songs
2017 singles
Sam Smith (singer) songs
Logic (rapper) songs
Capitol Records singles
Songs written by Sam Smith (singer)
Songs written by Timbaland
Songs written by Jimmy Napes
Song recordings produced by Timbaland
Songs written by Darryl Pearson (musician)
Soul ballads
Songs written by Larrance Dopson